Agullent is a municipality in the comarca of Vall d'Albaida in the Valencian Community, Spain.

References

External links
Official website of the village
Official website of the major festival

Municipalities in the Province of Valencia
Vall d'Albaida